Jens Madsen can refer to:

 Jens Christian Madsen (born 1970), Danish footballer
 Jens Christian Mosegaard Madsen (born 1972), Danish footballer
 Jens-Erik Madsen (born 1981), Danish cyclist